Lauras Entscheidung  is a 1994 German television film.

Cast
Suzanne von Borsody as Laura Völlenklee
Matthias Habich as Joachim Böllinger
Peter Sattmann as Max Samtwerth
Dörte Lyssewski as Irmi Schadewald
Oliver Czeslik
Chantal De Freitas as Rebecca Hilmar
Heino Ferch as Wasserwerkmeister Galreith
Rainer Grenkowitz
Norbert Heckner
Heinz-Werner Kraehkamp as Bürgermeister Sommer
Victoria Ludwigs as Bella Völlenklee
Naoyoshi Nishio as Oshi
Götz Otto
Johannes Rapp
August Schmölzer
Ferdinand Zander

External links

1994 films
1994 television films
German television films
1990s German-language films
German-language television shows
Films directed by Uwe Janson
ZDF original programming